Praxithea lanei is a species of beetle in the family Cerambycidae. It was described by Joly in 1999.

References

Torneutini
Beetles described in 1999